Touro is a neighborhood of the city of New Orleans. A subdistrict of the Central City/Garden District Area, its boundaries as defined by the New Orleans City Planning Commission are: St. Charles Avenue to the north, Toledano Street to the east, Magazine Street to the south and Napoleon Avenue to the west.

Geography

Adjacent Neighborhoods
 Milan (north)
 Garden District (east)
 East Riverside (south)
 Uptown (west)

Boundaries
The New Orleans City Planning Commission defines the boundaries of Touro as these streets: St. Charles Avenue, Toledano Street, Magazine Street and Napoleon Avenue.

Demographics
As of the census of 2000, there were 3,242 people, 1,672 households, and 482 families living in the neighborhood.  The population density was 10,807 /mi2 (4,053 /km2).

As of the census of 2010, there were 2,998 people, 1,572 households, and 429 families living in the neighborhood.

See also
 New Orleans neighborhoods

References

Neighborhoods in New Orleans